Capoeta antalyensis, also known as the Antalya barb or Pamphylian scraper, is a species of freshwater fish in the  family Cyprinidae.
It is found only in Turkey in the Aksu and Köprüçay River drainages, which flow south into the Gulf of Antalya in the Mediterranean.
Its lives in swiftly flowing stretches of rivers, but also found in lakes. It is threatened by habitat loss.

References

Antalyensis
Endemic fauna of Turkey
Fish described in 1943
Taxonomy articles created by Polbot